"B.B.K." is a song written and recorded by American nu metal band Korn for their third studio album, Follow the Leader. It was released as a promotional single in 1998.

Music and structure
The song prominently features harsh guitar sounds with somewhat of an influence of industrial music coming through, and features scat vocals in the spots of the song where most traditional metal bands would have opted to implement a guitar solo.

Concept

Live performance
The song was frequently performed live during Korn's Family Values tour in 1998. They performed the song during their limited Follow the Leader 20th anniversary (FTL20) tour, with one night each in San Francisco, Hollywood, and Las Vegas in September 2018.

Track listing

Mexican release
CD5" PRCD 97738
"B.B.K." – 3:56

References

Korn songs
1998 songs
1999 singles
Immortal Records singles
Songs written by Reginald Arvizu
Songs written by Jonathan Davis
Songs written by James Shaffer
Songs written by David Silveria
Songs written by Brian Welch

ru:B.B.K.